Euaugaptilus is a genus of copepods. The genus contains bioluminescent species.

Genera
The genus contains the following species:

Euaugaptilus affinis G. O. Sars, 1920
Euaugaptilus aliquantus Park, 1993
Euaugaptilus angustus (G. O. Sars, 1905)
Euaugaptilus antarcticus (Wolfenden, 1911)
Euaugaptilus atlanticus Roe, 1975
Euaugaptilus austrinus Park, 1993
Euaugaptilus brevirostratus Park, 1993
Euaugaptilus brodskyi Hulsemann, 1967
Euaugaptilus bullifer (Giesbrecht, 1889)
Euaugaptilus clavatus (G. O. Sars, 1907)
Euaugaptilus curtus Grice & Hulsemann, 1967
Euaugaptilus digitatus G. O. Sars, 1920
Euaugaptilus diminutus Park, 1970
Euaugaptilus distinctus (Brodsky, 1950)
Euaugaptilus elongatus (G. O. Sars, 1905)
Euaugaptilus facilis (Farran, 1908)
Euaugaptilus fagettiae T. K. S. Björnberg, 1975
Euaugaptilus farrani G. O. Sars, 1920
Euaugaptilus fecundus Tanaka & Omori, 1974
Euaugaptilus filigerus (Claus, 1863)
Euaugaptilus fosaii Pineda-Polo, 1979
Euaugaptilus fundatus Grice & Hulsemann, 1967
Euaugaptilus gibbus (Wolfenden, 1904)
Euaugaptilus gracilis (G. O. Sars, 1905)
Euaugaptilus graciloides Brodsky, 1950
Euaugaptilus grandicornis G. O. Sars, 1920
Euaugaptilus hadrocephalus Park, 1993
Euaugaptilus hecticus (Giesbrecht, 1893)
Euaugaptilus hulsemannae Matthews, 1972
Euaugaptilus humilis Farran, 1926
Euaugaptilus hyperboreus Brodsky, 1950
Euaugaptilus indicus Sewell, 1932
Euaugaptilus laticeps (G. O. Sars, 1905)
Euaugaptilus latifrons (G. O. Sars, 1907)
Euaugaptilus longicirrhus (G. O. Sars, 1905)
Euaugaptilus longimanus (G. O. Sars, 1905)
Euaugaptilus longiseta Grice & Hulsemann, 1965
Euaugaptilus luxus Tanaka & Omori, 1974
Euaugaptilus magnus (Wolfenden, 1904)
Euaugaptilus malacus Grice & Hulsemann, 1967
Euaugaptilus marginatus Tanaka, 1964
Euaugaptilus matsuei Tanaka & Omori, 1967
Euaugaptilus maxillaris G. O. Sars, 1920
Euaugaptilus modestus Brodsky, 1950
Euaugaptilus nodifrons (G. O. Sars, 1905)
Euaugaptilus nudus Tanaka, 1964
Euaugaptilus oblongus (G. O. Sars, 1905)
Euaugaptilus pachychaeta Matthews, 1972
Euaugaptilus pacificus Matthews, 1972
Euaugaptilus palumboi (Giesbrecht, 1889)
Euaugaptilus parabullifer Brodsky, 1950
Euaugaptilus paroblongus Matthews, 1972
Euaugaptilus penicillatus G. O. Sars, 1920
Euaugaptilus perasetosus Park, 1993
Euaugaptilus propinquus G. O. Sars, 1920
Euaugaptilus pseudaffinis Brodsky, 1950
Euaugaptilus quaesitus Grice & Hulsemann, 1967
Euaugaptilus rectus Grice & Hulsemann, 1967
Euaugaptilus rigidus (G. O. Sars, 1907)
Euaugaptilus roei Matthews, 1972
Euaugaptilus sarsi Grice & Hulsemann, 1965
Euaugaptilus similis (Farran, 1908)
Euaugaptilus squamatus (Giesbrecht, 1889)
Euaugaptilus sublongiseta Park, 1970
Euaugaptilus tenuicaudis (G. O. Sars, 1905)
Euaugaptilus tenuispinus G. O. Sars, 1920
Euaugaptilus truncatus (G. O. Sars, 1905)
Euaugaptilus unisetosus Park, 1970
Euaugaptilus vescus Park, 1970
Euaugaptilus vicinus G. O. Sars, 1920

References

Calanoida
Bioluminescent copepods
Copepod genera